Geronimo is a 1993 American historical Western television film directed by Roger Young and starring Joseph Runningfox in the title role. It also stars Jimmy Herman and Adan Sanchez, and was distributed by TNT on December 5, 1993.

Plot
The film is a fictionalized account of the Apache leader Geronimo.

Cast
 Joseph Runningfox as Geronimo
 Nick Ramus as Mangas
 Michael Greyeyes as Juh
 Tailinh Agoyo as Alope (as Tailinh Forest Flower)
 Jimmy Herman as Old Geronimo 
 August Schellenberg as Cochise
 Michelle St. John 
 Eddie Spears as Ishkiye
 Cody Lightning as Young Daklugie
 Ray Geer as Teddy Roosevelt 
 Annie Olson as Mrs. Roosevelt

Production
It was shot in Tucson, Arizona.

Reception
Geronimo debuted on television five days before the theatrical release of Geronimo: An American Legend. Walter Hill, director of the theatrical film, blamed the poor reception of his film on the screening of the TV movie. Hill said, "I don't think there are a hell of a lot of movies where you can take basically the same story, show it to 50 million people and bring yours out a week later and think that you're going to do great. What can you say, `My Geronimo has better locations?' "

References

External links
 

1993 television films
1993 films
1993 Western (genre) films
Cultural depictions of Geronimo
Cultural depictions of Theodore Roosevelt
Films about Native Americans
Apache Wars films
Films set in the 1880s
TNT Network original films
American Western (genre) television films
1990s English-language films
Films directed by Roger Young